Live From Nowhere, Volume 2 is a live album by Over the Rhine, released in 2007, containing highlights from the band's 2006 shows.  The CD was limited to 5,000 copies and comes in a fold-out digipak.

Track listing

I Want You To Be My Love
Fever
Failed Christian (Ash Wednesday Mix)
Long Lost Brother
Everybody Wants To Feel Like You
(John Prine)
Jesus In New Orleans
Anything At All
North Pole Man
Little Did I Know
Orphan Girl
Baby It's Cold Outside
Hush Now (Tipsy Gypsy Mix)
OtR: Off the Rails

Over the Rhine (band) albums
2007 live albums